Maderna is a surname. Notable people with the surname include:

Bruno Maderna (1920–1973), Italian conductor and composer
Carlos Maderna (1910–1976), Argentine chess master
Divya Maderna, Indian politician
Giovanni Maderna,  Italian film director
Ezequiel Maderna (born 1986), Argentine boxer 
Mahipal Maderna (born 1952), Indian politician
Marianne Maderna,  Austrian installation artist
Parasram Maderna (1926–2014), Indian politician